Ahmad Zaki Pasha (26 May 1867 – 5 July 1934) was an Egyptian philologist, sometimes called the  "Dean of Arabism"  or "Shaikh al-Orouba ", and longtime secretary of the Egyptian Cabinet.

Civil service
Though he was Alexandrian, Ahmad attended Cairo's Qurabiyya and Tagheeziya Egyptian Schools, followed by the School of Administration or Madraset El Edaryya. He also became an editor and translator for al-Waqa'i`al-Masriya, a translation teacher for the Khedivial School, and an Arabic teacher for the French Archaeological Institute in Cairo, all in 1888. In the following year he won a competition for the post of translator for the Cabinet, for which he became adjunct secretary in 1897 and secretary-general in 1911, serving until he retired in 1921. During World War I he also recodified Egypt's administrative procedures in keeping with its status as a British protectorate.

Scholarly activities
Because of his wide range of interests and numerous publications, he became a fellow of the Institut d'Égypte, the Royal Geographical Society, and the Royal Asiatic Society in London. He served on the administrative boards of both al-Azhar and the Egyptian University (now named Cairo University), also holding the chair for Islamic civilization in the latter. He took the lead in setting the Classical Arabic-language equivalents of European loanwords, such as sayyara (سيارة) for "automobile," and also alerted the press to the Arabic origins of many Spanish and Portuguese place-names that had been inaccurately transcribed into Arabic. He participated in many conferences of the International Congress of Orientalists and was respected by Europeans for his erudition.

Pan-Arabism
He was a staunch nationalist Egyptian from his youth, later pan-Arab and even pan-Oriental, becoming one of the founders and first secretary-general of al-Rabita al-Sharqiyya (the Oriental League or the Eastern league). His Giza home, Bayt al-'Uruba, became the meeting place for visitors from all Arab countries, mainly the Gulf region, even at times a site for reconciliations between quarreling Arab princes, and a repository of wealthy Arab antique furniture, jewelry, books, and manuscripts. He also erected a mosque near his home, where he is buried. A prodigious writer of articles and short books, he did not live long enough to complete what would have been the crowning achievement of his scholarship, an Arabic dictionary modeled on the French Larousse. He gave his books and manuscripts to the Egyptian National Library - Dar al-Kutub al-Masryia.

See also

Nahda

References
General

Specific

1867 births
1934 deaths
Nahda
Arabists
Egyptian Arabists
Book and manuscript collectors
Egyptian civil servants
Egyptian Muslims
Egyptian newspaper editors
Egyptian pashas
19th-century Egyptian people
Egyptian philologists
Egyptian scholars
Egyptian translators
Egyptian writers
Fellows of the Royal Asiatic Society
Fellows of the Royal Geographical Society
People from Alexandria
Language teachers
Egyptian Arab nationalists